Cannabis Is Safer Than Alcohol (CISTA) was a political party in the United Kingdom, which advocated the legalisation of cannabis.

The party was launched in February 2015. The party fielded candidates in the 2015 general election, campaigning for a Royal Commission to review the UK's drug laws relating to cannabis and to push the economic argument for legalisation, which it argued could generate £900 million in taxation. None of the candidates won a seat.

The party was deregistered by the Electoral Commission on 3 November 2016. Former members of the party from Northern Ireland registered a new party with the same initials, Citizens Independent Social Thought Alliance, in February 2017 to contest the 2017 Assembly election.

Electoral performance

General election, 7 May 2015
The party contested 32 constituencies, with its largest share of the vote coming in East Londonderry with 527 (1.5%).

Source: BBC News Election 2015

London mayoral election, 5 May 2016
Lee Harris stood for CISTA in the 2016 London Mayoral election. He finished ninth out of twelve candidates, obtaining 20,537 first-round votes (0.8%).

Northern Ireland Assembly election, 5 May 2016
The party contested four of the 18 constituencies, with its largest share of the vote in any election that the party had contested coming in Newry and Armagh with 2.2% (1,032 first-preference votes).

Citizens Independent Social Thought Alliance
Following the de-registering of Cannabis is Safer than Alcohol in November 2016, a new party bearing the same initials, Citizens Independent Social Thought Alliance, was registered with the Electoral Commission in February 2017, one week before the close of nominations for the snap elections to the Northern Ireland Assembly. The leader of this new party is Barry Brown, who was a CISTA candidate in 2016 and 2017.

Electoral performance

Northern Ireland Assembly election, 2 March 2017
The party contested three of the 18 constituencies, with its largest share of the vote coming in Newry and Armagh with 704 first-preference votes (1.3%).

2017 United Kingdom general election

See also
 Cannabis classification in the United Kingdom
 Cannabis in the United Kingdom
 Cannabis political parties
 Drug policy reform
 List of British politicians who have acknowledged cannabis use
 List of political parties in the United Kingdom

References

External links
 Official website
 Paul Birch, "The economic case for legalising cannabis", The Telegraph, 4 March 2015
 Election 2015: Cannabis is Safer than Alcohol Party, BBC News, 31 March 2015
 Lee Harris, the moral crusader turned cannabis activist vying to be London mayor, The Guardian, 12 March 2016

2015 establishments in the United Kingdom
Political parties established in 2015
Cannabis political parties of the United Kingdom
2015 in cannabis
Single-issue political parties in United Kingdom